Badjcinus turnbulli is an extinct thylacinid marsupial.

Phylogenetic analysis shows that thylacines are a clade which does not include the dasyurids. Badjcinus was one of the most primitive members of its group, living 23 to 28 million years ago in the late Oligocene.

The generic name combines the Wanyi Aboriginal language "badj", 'expert hunter', and a word from  Ancient Greek "kynos", meaning 'dog', from which the Thylacinidae name was originally derived. The specific epithet was proposed by the authors to honour the contributions of William D. Turnbull to palaeontology.

Badjcinus was quite small, averaging  in weight. It was a carnivore, probably eating small vertebrates and insects, as living Dasyurus species do today. The fossils were found at Riversleigh in north-west Queensland, Australia. Since other animals at Riversleigh were rainforest species, it is possible that B. turnbulli was arboreal, like Dasyurus maculatus.

References

Bibliography
 

Prehistoric thylacines
Prehistoric mammals of Australia
Oligocene marsupials
Prehistoric marsupial genera
Riversleigh fauna
Fossil taxa described in 1998